The Sanbanxi Dam is a concrete face rock-fill embankment dam on the Yuan (Qingshui) River in Jinping County, Guizhou Province, China. The dam houses a hydroelectric power station with 4 x 250 MW generators for a total installed capacity of 1,000 MW. Construction began in 2001 and was complete by 2006.

See also 

 List of power stations in China
 List of dams and reservoirs in China

References

Hydroelectric power stations in Guizhou
Dams in China
Concrete-face rock-fill dams
Dams completed in 2006